Hemiarius is a genus of sea catfishes  found in the coastal waters, estuaries, and rivers from South Asia through New Guinea and Australia to Oceania. Four described species are in this genus:

 Hemiarius dioctes (Kailola, 2000) (warrior catfish)
 Hemiarius harmandi Sauvage, 1880
 Hemiarius stormii (Bleeker, 1858) (armoured sea-catfish)
 Hemiarius verrucosus (H. H. Ng, 2003)

References
 

Ariidae
Catfish genera
Taxa named by Pieter Bleeker